Abu Jalal gaza  may refer to:
 Abu Jalal Gaza
 Abu Jalal Shomali